Dubiraphia bivittata is a species of riffle beetle in the family Elmidae.  It is found in North America.

References

Further reading

 
 
 
 
 
 

Elmidae